51 South Second Street is a residential and commercial property located in Newport, Pennsylvania.

Built around 1890, this two story side gabled brick on stone foundation has five bays, modern storefront on the north side of the first story, elaborate incising on window pediments and frieze board, eave brackets, a one-story 2/3 front porch with gingerbread and turned wooden columns.

History 
Was Charles Welfley Clothing, Bernie Carl Clothing, Charles Brandt Clothing, Newport One Price Store and Peter Schlomer Clothing and Saddlery. In the alley behind was the Kough Warehouse Commission.

It was designated a contributing property to the  Newport Historic District in 1999.

This property can also be found on the Newport Sesquicentennial Self-Guided Walking Tour.

It is also identified as #70 in the

References 

Geography of Perry County, Pennsylvania
Second Empire architecture in Pennsylvania
Italianate architecture in Pennsylvania
Working-class culture in Pennsylvania
National Register of Historic Places in Perry County, Pennsylvania
Historic district contributing properties in Pennsylvania